Tetragonoderus nagatomii is a species of beetle in the family Carabidae. It was described by Jedlicka in 1966.

References

nagatomii
Beetles described in 1966